The Gibraltar national football team represents Gibraltar in association football and is controlled by the Gibraltar Football Association (GFA), the governing body of the sport there. It competes as a member of the Union of European Football Associations (UEFA), which encompasses the countries of Europe. Organised football has been played in the country since the 19th century. Gibraltar first applied for UEFA membership in 1997 which was rejected, as UEFA would only allow membership for applicants recognised as sovereign states by the United Nations. In October 2012, Gibraltar reapplied for membership and it was granted in March 2013.

The list encompasses the records set by the team, their managers and their players since joining UEFA in 2013. The player records section itemises the team's leading goalscorers and those who have made most appearances in first-team competitions. Gibraltar's record appearance maker is Liam Walker, who has made 65 appearances since 2013. Liam Walker is also the record goalscorers, scoring four goals in total. All figures are correct as of the match played on 26 September 2022.

Player records

Appearances

 Most appearances: Liam Walker, 65
 Most consecutive appearances: Liam Walker, 40 (from 5 March 2014 to 8 September 2019)

List of ten most capped players

Goalscorers

 First goal scored: Roy Chipolina, 1 March 2014, 1–4 v Faroe Islands
 First goal conceded: Jóan Símun Edmundsson, 1 March 2014, 1–4 v Faroe Islands
 Fastest goal scored: 7th minute by Liam Walker, 16 November 2021 v Latvia
 Latest goal scored: 88th minute by Liam Walker, 25 March 2018 v Latvia
 Fastest goal conceded: 8 seconds by Christian Benteke, 10 October 2016 v Belgium
 Latest goal conceded: 94th minute
 Ermin Bičakčić, 7 September 2015 v Bosnia and Herzegovina
 Aleksandre Karapetian, 16 November 2018 v Armenia
 Oldest player to score: Roy Chipolina (39 years, 246 days)
 Youngest player to score: Tjay De Barr (18 years, 248 days)

List of goalscorers

Progression of goalscoring record

Goalkeepers

Managerial records

 First full-time manager: Allen Bula managed Gibraltar from 2010 (before Gibraltar became members of UEFA) to 2014
 Longest-serving manager: Julio César Ribas –  (29 June 2018 to present)
 Shortest tenure as manager: David Wilson – 5 months (March to July 2016)
 Highest win percentage: Desi Curry, 100%
 Lowest win percentage: Dave Wilson and Jeff Wood, 0.00%

Team records

Matches

Firsts

 First match (first match at Estádio Algarve): 0–0 v Slovakia, Friendly, 19 November 2013
 First match at Victoria Stadium: 1–4 v Faroe Islands, Friendly, 1 March 2014
 First UEFA European Championship qualifying match: 0–7 v Poland, 7 September 2014
 First FIFA World Cup qualification match: 1–4 v Greece, 6 September 2016
 First UEFA Nations League match: 0–2 v Macedonia, 6 September 2018

Record results
 Biggest win:
 1–0 v Malta, Friendly, 4 June 2014
 1–0 v Latvia, Friendly, 25 March 2018
 1–0 v Armenia, 2018–19 UEFA Nations League D, 13 October 2018
 2–1 v Liechtenstein, 2018–19 UEFA Nations League D, 16 October 2018
 1–0 v San Marino, 2020–21 UEFA Nations League D, 5 September 2020
 1–0 v Liechtenstein, 2020–21 UEFA Nations League D, 10 October 2020
 Biggest defeat: 0–9 v Belgium, 2018 FIFA World Cup qualification, 31 August 2017

Record consecutive results
 Record consecutive wins: 2, from 13 October 2018 to 16 October 2018
 Record consecutive defeats:
 12, from 29 March 2016 to 10 October 2017
 12, from 16 November 2018 to 18 November 2019
 Record consecutive draws:
 2, from 14 November 2020 to 17 November 2020
 2, from 23 March 2022 to 26 March 2022
 Record consecutive matches without a defeat:
 2, from 26 May 2014 to 4 June 2014
 2, from 13 October 2018 to 16 October 2018
 2, from 14 November 2020 to 17 November 2020
 2, from 23 March 2022 to 26 March 2022
 Record consecutive matches without a win: 24, from 7 September 2014 to 10 October 2017

Goals
 Most goals scored in a match: 2
 16 October 2018 v Liechtenstein, 2018–19 UEFA Nations League D
 16 November 2018 v Armenia, 2018–19 UEFA Nations League D
 15 October 2019 v Georgia, UEFA Euro 2020 qualifying
 Most goals conceded in a match: 9, 31 August 2017 v Belgium, 2018 FIFA World Cup qualification
 Most goals scored in a qualifying tournament: 4 in 10 matches, 2022 FIFA World Cup qualification
 Fewest goals scored in a qualifying tournament: 2 in 10 matches, UEFA Euro 2016 qualifying
 Most goals conceded in a qualifying tournament: 56 in 10 matches, UEFA Euro 2016 qualifying
 Fewest goals conceded in a qualifying tournament: 31 in 8 matches, UEFA Euro 2020 qualifying
 Most goals scored in the UEFA Nations League: 5 in 6 matches, 2018–19 League D
 Fewest goals scored the UEFA Nations League:
 3 in 4 matches, 2020–21 League D
 3 in 6 matches, 2022–23 League C
 Most goals conceded in the UEFA Nations League: 18 in 6 matches, 2022–23 League C
 Fewest goals conceded the UEFA Nations League: 1 in 4 matches, 2020–21 League D

Points
 Most points in a qualifying tournament:
 0 in 10 matches, UEFA European Championship qualifying, 2016
 0 in 10 matches, FIFA World Cup qualification, 2018
 0 in 8 matches, UEFA European Championship qualifying, 2020
 0 in 10 matches, FIFA World Cup qualification, 2022
 Fewest points in a qualifying tournament:
 0 in 10 matches, UEFA European Championship qualifying, 2016
 0 in 10 matches, FIFA World Cup qualification, 2018
 0 in 8 matches, UEFA European Championship qualifying, 2020
 0 in 10 matches, FIFA World Cup qualification, 2022
 Most points in the UEFA Nations League: 8 in 3 matches, 2020–21 League D
 Fewest points in the UEFA Nations League: 1 in 6 matches, 2022–23 League C

Statistics

By opponent

By competition

By home stadium

References

Records
National football team records
National association football team records and statistics